1865 was the 79th season of cricket in England since the foundation of Marylebone Cricket Club (MCC). W. G. Grace made his debut as a first-class player and the new Lancashire County Cricket Club played its first match.

Events
 15 & 16 February: Earliest inter-colonial match in the West Indies was Barbados v. Demerara (now Guyana) at Bridgetown.  This is recognised as the start of West Indian first-class cricket.
 3 March: Formation of Worcestershire County Cricket Club, which became first-class in 1899.
 22 June: W. G. Grace made his first-class debut playing for Gentlemen of the South v. Players of the South. This was a two-day match which his team won by an innings and 58 runs. Amazingly, he began his career with a duck: st HH Stephenson b G Bennett. However, he made up for this disappointment by taking 5-44 and 8-40 when aged just 16! Grace played in five matches during his debut season but he was still not attached to a first-class county (Gloucestershire did not become a first-class team until 1870).  His other games in 1865 were for Gentlemen v. Players (twice), England v. Surrey and Gentlemen of England v. Gentlemen of Middlesex. Grace played until 1908, and remains peerless as a player and became known to history as "The Great Cricketer".  A massive personality who was the sport's supreme all-rounder, but best remembered as a master batsman who conquered the uncertain pitch conditions of his early years before the heavy roller and motor mower eliminated deadly shooters and "bumping" or "flying" balls on the head. His superiority over his contemporaries is astounding and only Don Bradman has a similar stature in the game's history.
 18 July: The All England Eleven beat the three-year-old record for the highest first-class team total by scoring 524 against Yorkshire, with all eleven batsmen reaching double figures.
 20 July: Lancashire County Cricket Club joined the list of teams generally accepted in the unofficial County Championship and played its initial first-class match against Middlesex at Old Trafford.
 23 July:
 Edward Walker becomes the first bowler to twice take all ten wickets in an innings (having done so in 1859 for England against Surrey), but despite this Lancashire win their inaugural first-class match (they would not win again until 1868)
 For the only time until 1895, multiple cases of all ten wickets in a first-class innings occur
 10 August: Tom Humphrey becomes the first batsman to score 1,000 first-class runs in a season. With the improvement of pitches this feat has been achieved every season since 1869 except the exceptionally cool and wet 1879 season.
 For the last time until 1972, no bowler took 100 first-class wickets, with James Lillywhite having the highest aggregate of 87

Playing record (by county)

Leading batsmen (qualification 10 innings)

Leading bowlers (qualification 800 balls)

References

Annual reviews
 Fred Lillywhite, The Guide to Cricketers, Lillywhite, 1866
 John Lillywhite's Cricketer's Companion (Green Lilly), Lillywhite, 1866
 Arthur Haygarth, Scores & Biographies, Volume 9 (1865-1866), Lillywhite, 1867

1865 in English cricket
English cricket seasons in the 19th century